Randeep Singh Sarai  (born April 15, 1975) is a Canadian politician who was elected as a Member of Parliament in the House of Commons of Canada to represent the federal electoral district Surrey Centre during the 2015 Canadian federal election.

Early life 
Sarai was born and raised in Vancouver, British Columbia to Sikh parents who had immigrated from Sarai Khas, Punjab, India. As a youth he developed a strong background in real estate development and urban planning. After graduating from Burnaby South Secondary School in 1993 Sarai earned his bachelors of arts at the University of British Columbia with a major in political science in 1998. He then attended law school at Queen's University in Kingston, Ontario, graduating with a Bachelor of Laws (LLB) in 2001. Sarai was called to the bar in 2002, and practiced at a local law firm in Surrey before pursuing a career in politics.

Federal politics 
On October 19, 2015, Sarai was elected Member of Parliament for Surrey- Centre. He formerly sat on the Citizenship and Immigration Committee as well as the Canada- U.S. Inter-Parliamentary Association. Sarai had been the chair of the Liberal Party Pacific caucus, but has since resigned. and the co-chair of the Canada-Singapore Parliamentary Friendship Group.

Electoral record

References

External links

1975 births
21st-century Canadian politicians
Canadian politicians of Punjabi descent
Canadian politicians of Indian descent
Canadian Sikhs
Lawyers in British Columbia
Liberal Party of Canada MPs
Living people
Members of the House of Commons of Canada from British Columbia
People from Surrey, British Columbia
Politicians from Vancouver
Queen's University Faculty of Law alumni
University of British Columbia alumni